Onde Roopa Eradu Guna (Kannada: ಒಂದೇ ರೂಪ ಎರಡು ಗುಣ) is a 1975 Indian Kannada film, directed by A. M. Sameevulla and produced by A. M. Sameevulla. The film stars Vishnuvardhan, Bhavani, Chandrakala and Chandrashekhar in lead roles. The film had musical score by Salil Chowdhury.

Cast

 Vishnuvardhan
 Bhavani
 Bharathi in Special Appearance
 Chandrakala
 Chandrashekhar 
 Ambareesh
 Shivaram
 Sampath
 Balakrishna
 Narasimharaju
 Sharapanjara Shivaram in guest appearance
 Maccheri in guest appearance
 Chethan Ramarao in guest appearance
 Manmatha Rao
 Raghu
 Shyam
 Nandagopal
 Muniyappa
 B. Jayashree
 Halam

Soundtrack 

shiva

Reception

References

External links
 
 

1975 films
1970s Kannada-language films
Films scored by Salil Chowdhury